James or Jim Bacon may refer to:

Jim Bacon (politician) (James Alexander Bacon, 1950–2004), Premier of Tasmania, 1998–2004
Jim Bacon (rugby) (born 1896), rugby union and rugby league footballer
Jim Bacon (weather forecaster) (born 1950), BBC weather forecaster
Sir James Bacon (judge) (1798–1895), British bankruptcy court judge and a Vice-Chancellor of Chancery Court
James Bacon (author) (1914–2010), American author and actor
James Bacon (architect), American architect